Isa Khan Niazi was an Afghan noble in the courts of Sher Shah Suri and his son Islam Shah Suri, of the Sur dynasty, who fought the Mughal Empire.

Biography 
Isa Khan Niazi was born in 1453 and his last brother was born in 1478. He died in Delhi in 1548 at the age of 95. 
The time of 1451 – 1525 was the golden period for these khans. It was the time when Lodhis completely dominated the subcontinent (Hindustan). Isa Khan Niazi was a prominent member among the ruling family. He was in the same tribal unit of nobles as Ibrahim Lodhi, Sher Shah Suri. Most of these families were attached with the Delhi sultanate. There, a contention arose between Isa Khan Niazi and Sher Shah Suri which ended in mutiny.

Isa Khan's tomb complex

Tomb 
Isa Khan's tomb was built during his lifetime (ca 1547-48 AD). It is situated near the site of the Mughal Emperor Humayun's Tomb complex in Delhi which was built later (between 1562 and 1571 AD). This octagonal tomb has distinct ornamentation in the form of canopies, glazed tiles and lattice screens, and a deep veranda surrounding it, which is supported by pillars. It stands to the south of the Bu Halima garden at the entrance of the complex. An inscription on a red sandstone slab indicates that the tomb is that of Masnad Ali Isa Khan, son of Umar Khan, the Chief chamberlain, and was built during the reign of Islam Shah Suri, son of Sher Shah, in 1547-48 A.D.
On 5 August 2011, restoration work on this tomb led to the discovery of India's oldest sunken garden. Isa Khan’s garden tomb is considered the earliest example of an Indian sunken garden attached to a tomb. This concept was later developed at Akbar’s Tomb and at the Taj Mahal.

Mosque 
At the edge of the complex, across from the tomb, lies a mosque with noticeable mihrabs. It is known as Isa Khan's Mosque. It was built at the same time as the tomb. Many of the architectural details present in these structures (such as the tomb being placed in a walled garden enclosure) can be seen evolved to a grander scale in the main Humayun's tomb.

Ancestry
Isa Khan belonged to a Pashtun tribe, Niazi. His descendants are still living in Qila Niazi, Paktia Province, Afghanistan, and in Mianwali, Pakistan. The municipality was created in 1875. Imran Khan Niazi, the Pakistan Prime Minister’s ancestry is from the Niazi tribe.

References

External links 

Mughal Empire
Sur Empire
Afghan government officials
16th-century Afghan people
History of Delhi
Indian people of Pashtun descent
1453 births
1548 deaths